The 2012 BRD Năstase Țiriac Trophy was a tennis tournament played on outdoor clay courts. It was the 20th edition of the BRD Năstase Țiriac Trophy tournament, and was part of the ATP World Tour 250 Series of the 2012 ATP World Tour. It was held in Bucharest, Romania, 23 April until 29 April 2012. It was the first edition of the tournament to be played in spring after 19 years, when it was played in autumn. First-seeded Gilles Simon won the singles title.

Singles main draw entrants

Seeds

 1 Rankings are as of April 16, 2012

Other entrants
The following players received wildcards into the singles main draw:
  Marius Copil
  Victor Crivoi
  Gabriel Moraru

The following players received entry from the qualifying draw:
  Attila Balázs
  Daniel Brands
  Guillaume Rufin
  Jürgen Zopp

The following players received entry as lucky loser:
  Érik Chvojka

Withdrawals
The following players withdrew from the singles main draw:
  Julien Benneteau (elbow fracture) 
  Jürgen Melzer (ankle injury) 
  Philipp Petzschner

Doubles main draw entrants

Seeds

 Rankings are as of April 16, 2012

Other entrants
The following pairs received wildcards into the doubles main draw:
  Marius Copil /  Alexander Waske
  Andrei Dăescu /  Florin Mergea
The following pair received entry as alternates:
  Martin Emmrich /  Andreas Siljeström

Withdrawals
  Jürgen Melzer (ankle injury)

Finals

Singles

 Gilles Simon defeated  Fabio Fognini, 6–4, 6–3
It was Simon's 1st title of the year and 10th of his career. It was his 3rd win in Bucharest, after 2007 and 2008.

Doubles

 Robert Lindstedt /  Horia Tecău defeated  Jérémy Chardy /  Łukasz Kubot, 7–6(7–2), 6–3

References

External links
Official website

BRD Nastase Tiriac Trophy
Romanian Open
2012 in Romanian tennis
April 2012 sports events in Romania